Carbona  is a genus of moths of the family Noctuidae.

References

Natural History Museum Lepidoptera genus database

Hadeninae